The 1914 Brooklyn Tip-Tops season was a season in American baseball. The Tip-Tops finished in 5th place in the Federal League, 11½ games behind the Indianapolis Hoosiers.

Regular season

Season standings

Record vs. opponents

Roster

Player stats

Batting

Starters by position 
Note: Pos = Position; G = Games played; AB = At bats; H = Hits; Avg. = Batting average; HR = Home runs; RBI = Runs batted in

Other batters 
Note: G = Games played; AB = At bats; H = Hits; Avg. = Batting average; HR = Home runs; RBI = Runs batted in

Pitching

Starting pitchers 
Note: G = Games pitched; IP = Innings pitched; W = Wins; L = Losses; ERA = Earned run average; SO = Strikeouts

Other pitchers 
Note: G = Games pitched; IP = Innings pitched; W = Wins; L = Losses; ERA = Earned run average; SO = Strikeouts

Relief pitchers 
Note: G = Games pitched; W = Wins; L = Losses; SV = Saves; ERA = Earned run average; SO = Strikeouts

References 
1914 Brooklyn Tip-Tops at Baseball Reference

Brooklyn Tip-Tops seasons
Brooklyn Tip-Tops season
Brooklyn Tip-Tops season
1910s in Brooklyn
Park Slope